The Horan-Little Shield is a trophy in Australia's domestic rugby union competition. 
Proposed to the Australian Rugby Union, now known as Rugby Australia, by members of the Green and Gold Rugby supporters website, 
it was first played for in 2015.

The Shield is modelled on New Zealand's Ranfurly Shield, in which the holding union must defend the shield in challenge matches, and a successful challenger becomes the new holder of the Shield. The team who holds the Shield at the conclusion of the National Rugby Championship is considered to have won the Shield for that year, and are the only team to have their name engraved on it.

The Shield is named for former Wallaby players Tim Horan and Jason Little to symbolise friendship and community. Horan and Little played together and against each other from junior club level all the way up to become Australia's centre field partnership in winning the Rugby World Cup.

The Shield was first won by Melbourne Rising before the 2015 season, by virtue of their undefeated record in the inaugural NRC regular season.

Challenges
Terms of competition for the Horan-Little Shield are:

A team that holds the Shield is required to put it up for challenge at every home fixture. They are not obliged to accept challenges for away fixtures, though they may choose to do so.

If a team has successfully defended two challenge matches since becoming the Shield holder, then that team's subsequent matches, home or away, become automatic challenges. The Shield holder at the end of the regular season (or after a finals match where the holder chose to put the Shield up for challenge) becomes the only team whose name is engraved on the Shield as winner for that season.

Shield record

See also

 History of rugby union in Australia

Notes
 Melbourne Rising notably defended the shield for the first time in an away fixture against Queensland Country.

 Western Force inherited the shield when they replaced Perth Spirit as  Western Australia's team in the NRC for the 2018 season. Spirit had won it in the final round of the 2017 regular season.

References

External links
 Original announcement and rules 

Rugby union trophies and awards
Australian sports trophies and awards
Awards established in 2015
Rugby union competitions in Australia
2015 establishments in Australia
National Rugby Championship
Rugby union competitions for provincial teams